is a Japanese footballer, playing as a centre back for Nagoya Grampus and the Japan national team.

Club career

Kashiwa Reysol
Nakatani made his official debut for Kashiwa Reysol in the J. League Division 1, on 22 October 2014 against Gamba Osaka in Kashiwa Hitachi Stadium in Kashiwa, Japan. He started and played the full match. Nakatani and his club lost the match 1-0.

After five years as a pro in Kashiwa, Nakatani switched mid-season to Nagoya Grampus in June 2018.

International career
He made his debut for Japan national football team on 30 March 2021 in a World Cup qualifier against Mongolia.

Club career statistics
Updated to 5 November 2022.

Honours
Nagoya Grampus
J.League Cup: 2021

References

External links 
Profile at Kashiwa Reysol

1996 births
Living people
People from Sakura, Chiba
Association football people from Chiba Prefecture
Japanese footballers
Japan international footballers
J1 League players
J3 League players
Kashiwa Reysol players
Nagoya Grampus players
J.League U-22 Selection players
Association football defenders